Dr. Steel may refer to:

Fictional characters
 Doctor Steel, a steampunk musician
 Dr. Steel, a character in the Big Jim action figure series
 Doctor Steel, a French comic series from Soleil Productions, being written by Jerry Frissen and drawn by Sean 'Cheeks' Galloway

Scientists
 Duncan Steel (born 1955), an English Astrophysicist
 Mike Steel (mathematician), New Zealand mathematician